Jules-Martial Regnault de Prémaray (11 June 1819 in Pont-d'Armes Loire-Atlantique – 11 June 1868) was a French author. He was literary editor (and then, from 1848, chief editor) of la Patrie. He published several poems, dramas and vaudevilles.

Theatre 

 Le Cabaret de la veuve, vaudeville in 1 act, with Léon Paillet, Paris, Théâtre Saint-Marcel, 20 April 1841
 Le Docteur Robin, comédie en vaudevilles in 1 act, Paris, Théâtre du Gymnase-Dramatique, 21 October 1842
 La Marquise de Rantzau, ou la Nouvelle Mariée, comedy in 2 acts, mixed with distincts, Paris, Théâtre du Gymnase-Dramatique, 13 December 1842
 Bertrand l'horloger, ou le Père Job, comédie en vaudevilles in 2 acts, Paris, Théâtre du Gymnase-Dramatique, 3 March 1843
 Les Deux favorites, ou l'Anneau du Roi, comédie en vaudevilles in 2 acts, Paris, Théâtre du Gymnase-Dramatique, 18 April 1843
 Le Capitaine Lambert, comédie en vaudevilles in 2 acts, Paris, Théâtre du Gymnase-Dramatique, 23 octobre 1843 [unpublished]
 Manon, ou Un épisode de la Fronde, comédie en vaudevilles in 2 acts, Paris, Théâtre du Gymnase-Dramatique, 24 November 1843
 Part à deux, comedy en 1 act, mixed with songs, Paris, Théâtre Beaumarchais, 15 May 1844
 Sarah Walter, comédie en vaudevilles in 2 acts, Paris, Théâtre du Gymnase-Dramatique, 14 June 1844 [unpublished]
 Le Tailleur de la Place Royale, drama in 3 acts preceded by a prologue titled La Taverne du Pas de la Mule, Paris, Théâtre Beaumarchais, 11 July 1844
 La Comtesse de Moranges, drama-vaudeville in 3 acts, Paris, Théâtre Beaumarchais, 7 November 1845
 Une femme laide, comedy in 2 acts mixed with a song, Paris, Théâtre du Palais-Royal, 16 December 1845
 Simplice, ou le Collégien en vacances, vaudeville in 1 act, with Narcisse Fournier, Paris, Théâtre du Gymnase dramatique, 22 November 1846
 Le Chevalier de Saint-Remy, drama in 5 acts and 6 tableaux, with Antoine-François Varner, Paris, Théâtre de la Gaité, 22 June 1847
 L'Ordonnance du médecin, comédie en vaudevilles in 1 act, Paris, Théâtre du Palais-Royal, 29 Octobre 1847
 Le Jour de charité, vaudeville in 1 act, Paris, Théâtre des Délassements-Comiques, 7 June 1850
 La Peau de mon oncle, vaudeville in 1 act, with Charles Varin, Paris, Théâtre Montansier, 20 August 1850
 L'Amant de cœur, vaudeville in 1 act, with Paul Siraudin, Paris, Théâtre Montansier, 17 July 1851
 Les Droits de l'homme, comedy in 2 acts in prose, Paris, Théâtre de l'Odéon, 5 November 1851
 Monsieur le Vicomte, comédie en vaudevilles in 2 acts, with Eugène Nyon, Paris, Théâtre des Variétés, 10 January 1853
 Les Cœurs d'or, comedy in 3 acts, mixed with a song, with Léon Laya and Amédée Achard, Paris, Théâtre du Gymnase, 15 July 1854
 Donnez aux pauvres, comedy in 2 acts and in prose, Paris, Théâtre de l'Odéon, 1 February 1855
 La Boulangère a des écus, drama in 5 acts and 6 tableaux, Paris, Théâtre de la Porte-Saint-Martin, 24 November 1855 Texte en ligne
 La Jeunesse de Grammont, comedy in 1 act, in prose, Paris, Théâtre de l'Odéon, 5 February 1862
Varia
 Les Cendres de Napoléon, ode à Mgr le prince de Joinville, 1840
 Les Proverbes menteurs, published as a serial in La Patrie, 1850-1853
 Le Chemin des écoliers, novel in 3 acts (and in prose), proverbe, 1853
 Promenades sentimentales dans Londres et le Palais de cristal, lettres de Londres au journal La Patrie, 1851
 Rien, chroniques du monde et du théâtre, 1861

Sources 
 Gustave Vapereau, Dictionnaire universel des littératures, Paris, Hachette, 1876, p. 1209
 Joseph Marie Quérard, La France littéraire, Paris : L'Éditeur, 1859-1864, t. XII, p. 36-39
 Jules Brisson et Félix Ribeyre, Les Grands Journaux de France, Paris : Dumineray, 1863, p. 95-98

19th-century French dramatists and playwrights
19th-century French journalists
French male journalists
19th-century French poets
French male poets
19th-century French male writers
People from Loire-Atlantique
1819 births
1868 deaths